Ogden Telephone Company is a telephone operating company of Frontier Communications. It provides service to Spencerport, New York. It was founded in 1907 and acquired by Citizens Telecommunications, now Frontier, in 1997.

References

Frontier Communications
Communications in New York (state)
Telecommunications companies of the United States
Telecommunications companies established in 1907
American companies established in 1907
1907 establishments in New York (state)